Anzavur Ahmed Anchok Pasha (1885 – 15 April 1921) was an Ottoman soldier, gendarme officer, pasha, and militia leader of Circassian origin. He was declared a Pasha by the late Ottoman government.

Biography 
Anzavur served as a major during World War I. After the Ottomans lost in World War I, he believed that the only way to salvation was to cooperate with the invading British forces as he was loyal to the caliph, and he believed Atatürk's Turkish national movement was not only blasphemous, but also would only hurt the future of the land as it would eventually fail and would do nothing but anger the British-Greek forces. Thus, he became a guerrilla leader in Anatolia and started what is known as Revolt of Ahmet Anzavur. He was then declared a Pasha by the Istanbul government, had massive power, lots of support from the British, and he gathered a lot of men, whom he convinced by using religion, under his command. He secured a deal with local Greeks and captured the entire Marmara Region and his revolt was seen as a serious threat that could go as far as ending the Turkish War of Independence. The revolt was defeated by, Çerkes Ethem. Çerkes Ethem was an Islamic socialist, who while not agreeing with Atatürk's nationalism, believed that Atatürk's movement was the only option as he saw the invasion forces as infidel enemies and declared on many occasions that he would not sabotage the Turkish national movement.

Anzavur was sentenced to death on 15 April 1921 in the village of Adliye near Karabiga, while Çerkes Ethem, who defeated him and countless other revolters as well as many Greek forces, would later be declared as a traitor due to clashes with İsmet İnönü.

See also
Revolt of Ahmet Anzavur

References

1921 deaths
1885 births
People from the Ottoman Empire of Circassian descent
Ottoman military officers
Ottoman military personnel of World War I
20th-century executions by Turkey
Turkish people of Circassian descent
Pashas